Lonoke is the second most populous city in Lonoke County, Arkansas, United States, and serves as its county seat.  According to 2010 United States Census, the population of the city is 4,245. It is part of the Little Rock–North Little Rock–Conway Metropolitan Statistical Area.

History

Lonoke's history begins with the advance of Union troops through Central Arkansas during the American Civil War.  The town of Brownsville was burned to the ground by Union forces after the retreat of Confederate forces westward to Little Rock.  After the war, it was decided by the city leaders of Brownsville that a new town should be formed by the nearby railroad so that those who wished to stay could do so.

According to local legend, the town was named for a large red oak tree that was found while trees were being chopped down in order to build houses.  The official name of the city was originally Lone Oak.  However, due to a misprint in the Lonoke Democrat newspaper, the town's name was printed as Lonoak.  Eventually, this misspelling became further misspelled as Lonoke.

The town of Lonoke was very slow to grow.  Lonoke maintained a sustainable population through the support of its agricultural based economy until World War II.  Because of the baby boom, Lonoke's population began to reach higher numbers.  Furthermore, Lonoke became a sort of suburban area of Little Rock due to the implementation of the Interstate Highway System and the construction of Interstate 40.

In recent years, the population of Lonoke has remained in the area of about 4,000 people.  As the Little Rock metropolitan area continues to grow, Lonoke's population is expected to grow as well as Lonoke is becoming more suitable as a suburban area.

Eberts Field, used by the United States Army for pilot training during World War I and World War II, was located near Lonoke.

Geography
Lonoke is in central Lonoke County, located at  (34.784065, -91.900705).

Government
Lonoke is governed by a mayor-council form of city government, in which a mayor, other city administrators, and an eight-member city council are all regularly elected.  The city is divided into eight districts (analogous to wards in other cities), each represented on the council by an alderman.  In addition to the mayor, the city's clerk, treasurer, attorney and district judge are also popularly elected.

Education

The city of Lonoke lacks post secondary institutions due to its small population and rural nature. However, Lonoke does feature a public school district that includes a primary, elementary, middle, and high school. According to the National Institute for Higher Education, Lonoke High School has an average ACT score of 22. However, over 89% of the graduating class of high school from 1987 to 2007 has been accepted to an institution of higher education. Of those 89%, approximately 45% have attended Arkansas State University Beebe.

In addition to its public school system, Lonoke is home to the main campus of the Lonoke Exceptional School, which offers learning opportunities for children and adults with various developmental disabilities. The school has served Lonoke and surrounding areas since 1972; its main campus in downtown Lonoke was built in 1991.

Some areas of Lonoke are served by the Des Arc School District, which leads to graduation from Des Arc High School.

Demographics

2020 census

As of the 2020 United States census, there were 4,276 people, 1,676 households, and 1,075 families residing in the city.

2000 census
As of the 2000 census, there were 4,287 people, 1,595 households, and 1,092 families residing in the city. The racial makeup of the city was 73.29% White, 23.40% Black or African American, 0.77% Native American, 0.33% Asian, 0.05% Pacific Islander, 0.98% from other races, and 1.19% from two or more races. 1.84% of the population were Hispanic or Latino of any race.

There were 1,595 households, out of which 33.4% had children under the living with them, 50.4% were married couples living together, 14.1% had a female householder with no husband present, and 31.5% were non-families. 28.5% of all households were made up of individuals, and 14.9% had someone living alone who was 65 years of age or older. The average household size was 2.53 and the average family size was 3.14.

In the city, the population was spread out, with 26.3% under the, 8.7% from 18 to 24, 25.8% from 25 to 44, 21.5% from 45 to 64, and 17.7% who were 65 years of age or older. The median age was 37 years. For every 100 females, there were 88.4 males. For every 100 females age 18 and over, there were 82.4 males.

The median income for a household in the city was $31,558, and the median income for a family was $44,423. Males had a median income of $34,315 versus $22,642 for females. The per capita income for the city was $15,598. About 11.9% of families and 15.0% of the population were below the poverty line, including 16.6% of those under age 18 and 19.5% of those age 65 or over.

Notable people 
 Maurice Britt (1919–1995), University of Arkansas and Detroit lions football player, businessman, and decorated soldier; born in Carlisle but raised in Lonoke
 Ed Hamm (1906–1982), track and field athlete, won gold medal in long jump at 1928 Summer Olympics
 Jim Lee Howell (1914–1995), football player (Arkansas, NY Giants 1937–1947) and coach (Wagner College 1947–1953, NY Giants 1954–1960)
 Paula Jones (1966–), Arkansas state employee who sued Bill Clinton for sexual harassment
 James B. Reed (1881–1935), Democratic member of Arkansas House of Representatives in 1907 session and U.S. representative from 1923 to 1929 from Arkansas' former 6th congressional district
 Joseph Taylor Robinson (1872–1937), U.S. Senate Majority leader and Al Smith's running mate on Democratic ticket in 1928 U.S. presidential election
 Thomas Clark Trimble III (1878–1965), former federal judge
 Will Walls (1912–1993), American football player

See also 

 List of cities and towns in Arkansas
 National Register of Historic Places listings in Lonoke County, Arkansas

References

External links 

 Lonoke, Arkansas at Encyclopedia of Arkansas History & Culture
 Marjorie Walker McCrary Memorial Library at the Lonoke County Library System

 
Cities in Arkansas
Cities in Lonoke County, Arkansas
1872 establishments in Arkansas
Cities in Little Rock–North Little Rock–Conway metropolitan area
County seats in Arkansas
Planned cities in the United States
Populated places established in 1872